Paisley Hall is a historic mansion in Memphis, Tennessee, USA. It was built from 1908 to 1910 for Colonel Robert Galloway. It has been listed on the National Register of Historic Places since February 12, 1980.

References

Houses on the National Register of Historic Places in Tennessee
Colonial Revival architecture in Tennessee
Houses completed in 1910
Houses in Memphis, Tennessee
National Register of Historic Places in Memphis, Tennessee